Courtney Peldon (born April 13, 1981) is an American television and film actress.

Early life and education
Peldon was born in New York City, New York. Her younger sister Ashley is also an actress. Both she and Ashley became involved in the entertainment industry as a child actor.

Peldon graduated from Skidmore College where she majored in abnormal psychology and minored in film studies.

Career
Peldon starred on Broadway at age 8 in the Gershwin Theatre Meet Me in St. Louis for the show's entire run in the role of 'Tootie', originated by Margaret O'Brien in the Judy Garland film version.

Peldon is best known for her three seasons as Jonathan Taylor Thomas's on-screen girlfriend Lauren on Home Improvement, and for her three seasons on Boston Public. She has appeared in many roles on various television shows such as That '70s Show, Entourage, The Pretender, Star Trek: Deep Space Nine, Renegade and Nash Bridges.

She has played roles in several films including Angel Heart, Out on a Limb, Little Giants, indie film Skin Walker, National Lampoon's Adam & Eve, Tobe Hooper's Mortuary, and the Farrelly brothers' comedy Say It Isn't So. More recent films include the science fiction thriller InAlienable, the psychological thriller The Road to Hell.

Awards and nominations
For nine consecutive years, Peldon won, or at least was nominated for  a Young Artist Award.
1993 - Nominated for Best Young Actress in an Off-Primetime Series for Harry and the Hendersons and won for Best Young Actress Co-starring in a Motion Picture for Out on a Limb.
1994 - Won for Best Youth Actress Guest Starring in a Television Show for Lois & Clark: The New Adventures of Superman.
1995 - Nominated for Best Performance: Young Actress in a TV Comedy Series for The Mommies.
1996 - Nominated for Best Performance by a Young Actress in  TV Drama Series for Renegade.
1997 - Won for Best Performance in a TV Comedy by a Guest Starring Young Performer for Home Improvement; tied with Seth Adkins for Sabrina, the Teenage Witch.
1998 - Nominated for Best Performance in a TV Movie/Pilot/Mini-Series by a Supporting Young Actress for Little Girls in Pretty Boxes (TV movie).
1999 - Nominated for Best Performance in a TV Comedy Series by a Guest Starring Young Actress for Home Improvement.
2000 - Nominated for Best Performance in a TV Comedy Series by a Supporting Young Actress for Home Improvement.
2001 - Nominated for Best Performance in a TV Movie (Drama) by a Supporting Young Actress for The Princess & the Barrio Boy (TV movie).

Filmography

References

External links
 
 Courtney Peldon on Myspace

Actresses from New York City
American child actresses
American voice actresses
American film actresses
American soap opera actresses
American television actresses
Living people
1981 births
21st-century American women
Skidmore College alumni